Dyschirius gracilis is a species of ground beetle in the subfamily Scaritinae. It was described by Heer in 1837.

References

gracilis
Beetles described in 1837